Waverley Park (also and originally called VFL Park) was an Australian rules football stadium in Mulgrave, Victoria, Australia. For most of its history, its purpose was as a neutral venue and used by all Victorian-based Victorian Football League/Australian Football League clubs. However, during the 1990s it became the home ground of both the Hawthorn and St Kilda football clubs. It ceased to be used for AFL games from the 2000 season following the opening of Docklands Stadium. It is currently used as a training venue by Hawthorn. The main grandstand and oval are listed on the Victorian Heritage Register. The seating capacity is now 6,000, down from a peak of 72,000–90,000.

Origins
Waverley Park (then VFL Park) was first conceived in 1959 when delegates from the 12 VFL clubs asked the league to find land that was suitable for the building of a new stadium. In September 1962, the VFL secured a  block of grazing and market garden land in Mulgrave. The area was chosen because it was believed that, with the effects of urban sprawl and the proposed building of the South-Eastern (later called Monash) freeway, the area would become the demographic centre of Melbourne The VFL reportedly lobbied the state government to construct a rail connection to the stadium, but that never occurred.

The original plans were for a stadium catering for up to 157,000 patrons, which would have made it one of the biggest in the world. To accommodate the large number of patrons, the members' stand was to be extended around the whole ground. However, in 1982-1983, when the extensions were due to commence, the Government of Victoria, led by Premier John Cain, who was a member of the Melbourne Cricket Club, refused to approve the plans for the upgrade because it would have threatened the Melbourne Cricket Ground's (MCG) right to host the VFL Grand Final. The league-owned VFL Park had originally been built with the intent of replacing the MCG as the permanent home of the grand final, but the Victorian government, with interests in the MCG, refused to allow its capacity upgrade. Hence, no further development occurred and the ground capacity was set at just over 100,000 patrons, later reduced to 72,000.

The playing surface, being 200 metres long and 160 metres wide, was the biggest in the league. That caused some controversy, and the boundary lines and goals were relocated to make the playing area a similar size to the that of the MCG.   Waverley allowed Gippsland-based football patrons to attend VFL games, given the shorter travelling distance. Although its relative remoteness was irritating for some, it was a significant multi-purpose venue not based in the environs of the Melbourne CBD. However, in contrast with more central venues, its reliance on car transport to get spectators to the venue became an obvious weakness. The legacy of Waverley Park remains controversial.

Construction
Under the direction of architect Reginald E. Padey of Meldrum and Partners, work started at the site on 5 January 1966 when the VFL President Sir Kenneth Luke turned the first sod. The spoil was used to form the banks for some sections of the stadium.

On 18 April 1970, Fitzroy and Geelong played the first game at Waverley Park, in front of a crowd of 25,887. However, the stadium was far from completed, with only the first level of the K.G. Luke Stand having been finished. The rest of the stadium had only been constructed to ground level.

The Public Reserve Stands encircling the rest of the stadium were finished in 1974, at a cost of $4.5 million, and the car park was extended to fit a total of 25,000 cars. Lighting was added in May 1977, at a cost of $1.2 million, in time for the first of the 1977 night-series televised matches. In 1982, a monochrome video matrix scoreboard was installed, for the first time in VFL history, displaying instant replay highlights. In 1984, the arena was re-turfed and the drainage system upgraded. Two years later a mosaic mural, commemorating many great names of VFL football, was installed on the grandstand façade above the members' entrance. During the 1988 season, automatic turnstiles were introduced at the members' entrance.

Memorable events
 The first-ever final played at the ground was also the first ever elimination final played in AFL history, played between St Kilda and Essendon in 1972.
 During the 1973 season, 42,610 attended the first interstate match at the ground (between Victoria and Western Australia) and a record 60,072 attended the second semi-final between Carlton and Collingwood.
 Essendon and Carlton contested a once-off match on Anzac Day in 1975 (which Essendon won) in front of a crowd of 77,770.
 The record attendance was 92,935 for Collingwood versus Hawthorn in 1981.
 In 1977 Fitzroy played North Melbourne in the first night match at the stadium in the Amco-Herald Cup. The game started 55 minutes late after the State Electricity Commission's supply to the $1 million lighting system failed just ten minutes before the game was due to begin. A fuse was thought to have blown in the feeder pole to the ground. All power to the ground was turned off for 18 minutes while it was repaired.
 In 1977 VFL Park played host to the first 'Supertest' of Kerry Packer's World Series Cricket. It was also host to the first-ever day-night cricket game.
 In 1978 Fitzroy defeated North Melbourne to win the Night series premiership.
 On 15 November 1980 the band KISS played for a crowd of over 40,000 on their first tour of Australia.
 In 1987 Fitzroy played North Melbourne in the first night match at the stadium for premiership points in the major competition. A total of 183,383 people watched the three finals games at VFL Park and the preliminary final attendance of 71,298 was the largest since 1984. The game was between Melbourne and Hawthorn, and Hawthorn won from a goal kicked after the siren, by Gary Buckenara after a 15-metre penalty was awarded against Jim Stynes.
 In 1989 a match was played for premiership points on a Sunday at VFL Park for the first time.
 The ground hosted its first and only AFL Grand Final in 1991, which was contested by Hawthorn and the West Coast Eagles because the Melbourne Cricket Ground at the time was undergoing construction of the Great Southern Stand. In front of a crowd of 75,230, Hawthorn defeated West Coast by 53 points in the seniors grand final. The same day saw history in the making with Brisbane defeating Melbourne by 34 points in the reserves grand final, and with North Melbourne defeating Collingwood by 38 points in the very last under 19s grand final.
 In 1996 an unexpected pitch invasion occurred when the lights went out at the stadium in a night game between Essendon and St Kilda, during the third quarter due to a car hitting a transmission tower nearby. After declaring the match finished for the evening the AFL commission held an emergency meeting to decide what should happen as there was no provision in the official rules for an event like this. They decided to continue the match three days later. Essendon kept their winning position comfortably, starting with a 20-point lead and winning with a 22-point margin. Controversially, the Bombers made five changes to their line-up between the two parts of the match. One of Essendon players, James Hird, managed to pick up match votes in some of the media awards. Prior to the match, St Kilda coach Stan Alves complained about the situation and stated that his team is "not going to go kamikaze" and risk an injury when they did not have much chance of winning. The AFL subsequently decided on a set of rules to be applied for incidents of this kind, those being that if a game is not started the league in control of the match shall determine the result. Games that start but are interrupted prior to half-time are deemed to be drawn if the game can not recommence within 30 minutes, while if the game is interrupted after half-time the scores at the time are deemed to be final.

Football records
In its history, 732 AFL/VFL matches were played at Waverley Park, 70 of which were finals and one a grand final.
 Highest score: Fitzroy: 36.22 (238) v Melbourne: 6.12 (48) in round 17, 1979
 Largest crowd: 92,935, Queen's Birthday (6 June) 1981, Hawthorn v Collingwood
 Most goals scored in one game: Jason Dunstall, 17 goals, Round 7, 1992, Hawthorn v Richmond

Special events
Waverley Park hosted many special events other than Australian rules football. These included:
 Rock concerts: Rod Stewart (1979), Kiss (1980), David Bowie (1983), U2 (1998) and Simon & Garfunkel (1983). A 6 December 1993 concert for Michael Jackson's Dangerous Tour was cancelled after the tour was cut short.
 Cricket: World Series Cricket games between 1977 and 1979.
International rules football: Matches between Australia and Ireland.
 Baseball: Home of the Waverley Reds from 1989 until 1994.

Closure

In 1988 concrete cancer was discovered in the Southern Stand at the MCG. This provided the impetus to replace the 50-year-old stand with a state-of-the-art facility that was completed in 1992 at a cost of $150 million, subsequently named the Great Southern Stand. The new stand was jointly funded by the AFL, allowing the AFL the opportunity to negotiate a better commercial arrangement with the Melbourne Cricket Club. This reduced the AFL's incentive to drive finals and blockbuster games to Waverley Park.

In 1999 the Australian Football League announced that it would not schedule any further matches at Waverley Park. Instead it would aim to sell the ground and its surrounding land, hoping to raise a sum of $30 million to $80 million to go towards the construction of a new stadium under construction at Docklands at the western end of the Melbourne central business district. Later the League would also argue that a portion of the income from the sale of Waverley would provide further finance for the development of AFL football as a national code in Australia. The last official AFL game was played in 1999 between Hawthorn and Sydney in front of a sell-out crowd of 72,130.

After the decision to close the venue was made by the AFL, the ground's fundamental flaws were highlighted. Despite an excellent playing surface and its own water storage, focus shifted to its unfavourable position, and its antiquated corporate and spectator facilities available, such as the originally high tech but now ageing sepia-toned video screen.  Waverley Park was only 20 minutes from the Melbourne CBD  and was serviced by the Monash Freeway, It was primarily easy to access by car only as successive governments had failed to provide adequate public transport to the venue. The stadium's car park was large enough to service its crowds, but the access roads were incapable of dispersing them, and long delays for driving spectators were common. Spectators felt distanced from the game in the huge arena, and seating was only partly undercover giving it the unflattering nickname "Arctic Park" which was due to its location on an exposed site, with the prevailing south-westerly winds bringing rain to Melbourne's eastern suburbs directly from Port Phillip Bay.    

In 2000, AFL pre-season cup matches were played at the venue, and Victorian Football League games also took place there, including finals and the grand final. Melbourne's Eastern Football League also played division 1 and division 2 Grand Finals at the venue at the conclusion of the 2000 season. The 2000 VFL Grand Final was the last official game of football played at the venue. After that game, Waverley Park was not maintained and vandals eventually broke into the site and damaged the facilities. The playing surface, once one of the best in Australia, was reduced to a field of weeds. Victorian MP Mary Delahunty called on the AFL to mow the dilapidated stadium, as it was still under their control.

On 10 December 2001 the AFL confirmed that the land was sold to housing developer Mirvac to assist in financing the construction of the Docklands Stadium. The ground was demolished starting on 11 December 2002. Waverley Park served an important strategic purpose for the VFL/AFL as viable alternative venue for the Grand Final and other events, the AFL possessed a critical bargaining chip in negotiations with the Melbourne Cricket Club over MCG access.

Current status
Following its cessation as a venue for AFL football, the stadium fell into a state of disrepair, and anticipating complete demolition, the City of Greater Dandenong, on behalf of football patrons in southeast Victoria, moved quickly to nominate the whole of the facility and its grounds for heritage listing. The basis for the nomination is that the stadium was the first major stadium purpose built for Australian rules football, that its construction and ownership by the VFL provided the basis on which the league built its power base and eventual evolution to become the AFL, that it hosted the 1991 AFL Grand Final, that night-time cricket games were first held at the ground, and that the members' (or K.G. Luke) stand features a mural of football legends by noted artist Harold Freedman. The state-level heritage listing of Waverley Park has been cited by the executive director of Heritage Victoria as the seminal case for an understanding of the cultural heritage significance of 20th-century places.

Successful lobbying saw Heritage Victoria grant legislative protection to the site and, beginning in December 2002, portions of the stadium were demolished except for the members' stand and the members' stand mural. The surrounding car park has been replaced by suburban housing, including 1,400 new dwellings for 3,500 people. In homage to the original place and its purpose, the street layout mirrors the original car park and street names honour Waverley's patron Sir Kenneth Luke, architect Reginald Padey and other associations with football and cricket. The members' stand is visible from the nearby Monash Freeway; however, due to new noise walls being installed on the freeway alignment, the stand's visibility from the freeway has been significantly reduced.

The oval itself and the eight bays of the Sir Kenneth Luke Stand have been retained with the remaining section of the members stand, which have been redeveloped into a state-of-the-art training and administrative facility for the Hawthorn Football Club and the local community. The Hawthorn Football Club moved its administrative and training facilities from Glenferrie Oval to a redeveloped Waverley Park early in 2006 in preparation for the 2006 season. The facility incorporates an MCG-dimension oval, the size of the playing arena having been reduced from its original size, and includes a 25-metre heated indoor swimming pool, four refrigerated ice tanks, a gymnasium with a 60-metre running track and a warm-up area with projection and screen facilities to simulate match-day conditions. The grandstand has seating for around 2,000 patrons with the seating in the top level of the grandstand having been retained.

In 2018, the Hawthorn Football Club announced plans to build a new training and administration facility named the Kennedy Community Centre in Dingley to replace Waverley Park. It is currently unknown what the future is for Waverley Park once Hawthorn move to their new facility in Dingley.

References

External links
 Waverley Park Housing Estate official website
 
 Ballparks.com
 Waverly Baseball Club

Sources

 Greg Hobbs, "A Restless Birth," AFL Football Record, Vol 80, No 28, 28 September 1991, pp. 10–11.

1970 establishments in Australia
1999 disestablishments in Australia
Defunct Australian Football League grounds
Sports venues in Melbourne
World Series Cricket venues
Baseball venues in Australia
Heritage-listed buildings in Melbourne
Defunct cricket grounds in Australia
Music venues in Melbourne
Sports venues completed in 1970
Sports venues demolished in 2002
Demolished buildings and structures in Melbourne
Defunct baseball venues
History of baseball in Australia
Sport in the City of Monash
Buildings and structures in the City of Monash
Hawthorn Football Club